The Sra Ouertene mine is a large mine located in Kef Governorate. Sra Ouertene represents one of the largest phosphates reserve in Tunisia having estimated reserves of 10 billion tonnes of ore grading 17% P2O5.

See also 
Mining industry of Tunisia

References 

Phosphate mines in Tunisia